Hwange Colliery F.C. (formerly known as Wankie Colliery F.C.) is a football club from Hwange, Zimbabwe, currently playing in the Zimbabwe Premier Soccer League

The club has won its fair share of honours along its history, beating a star-studded Callies 6–1 to lift the Castle Cup in 1972. in 1973 Dynamos were beaten 1–0. In 1991 Chipangano lifted the Zifa Cup beating Cranborne Bullets 3–1.

Hwange were most recently promoted to the Zimbabwe top flight in 2018 after spending one year in the second division after a 2016 relegation.

Honours
Zimbabwean Cup: 3
1970, 1973, 1991

References

Hwange
Football clubs in Zimbabwe
Mining association football teams